Mentzelia multiflora, commonly known as Adonis blazingstar, Adonis stickleaf, desert blazingstar, prairie stickleaf and manyflowered mentzelia  is a herbaceous perennial wildflower of the family Loasaceae.

Distribution
Mentzelia multiflora is found in the western United States and northwestern Mexico: from Montana and North Dakota in the Great Plains; south to Texas and Southern California; and into  Sonora and Chihuahua.

This species prefers dry, sandy, well-drained soil. They require direct sunlight and are not found growing in the shade.

Description
It has shiny white stems and numerous branches. Its sticky, bright green leaves are covered with hairs containing minute barbs.

The flowers open in late afternoon and close in the morning. The flowers are hermaphrodite and flower from July to August.

Varieties
Varieties of Mentzelia multiflora include:
Mentzelia multiflora var. integra — M.E. Jones
Mentzelia multiflora var. longiloba —  (J. Darl.) Kartesz 
Mentzelia multiflora var. multiflora

Taxonomy
Mentzelia multiflora was first described by the botanists Thomas Nuttall and Asa Gray. It is a "blazingstar" and is a member of the genus Mentzelia, the "stickleafs".

Uses
Medicinal
The plant is used by the Native Americans, particularly the Navajo people, as a medicinal plant. It has been used to treat toothache and as a diuretic. The roots and leaves have been used to treat tuberculosis.

Cultivation
The plant is cultivated as an ornamental plant, used as a wildflower in specialty gardens.

References

External links

Calflora Database: Mentzelia multiflora (Adonis blazingstar)
Jepson Manual treatment for Mentzelia multiflora subsp. longiloba

multiflora
North American desert flora
Flora of the Great Plains (North America)
Flora of the Southwestern United States
Flora of Northwestern Mexico
Flora of the California desert regions
Flora of the Sonoran Deserts
Flora of Arizona
Flora of Nebraska
Flora of New Mexico
Flora of Oklahoma
Flora of Sonora
Flora of Texas
Natural history of the Mojave Desert
Plants used in traditional Native American medicine
Taxa named by Asa Gray
Taxa named by Thomas Nuttall
Flora without expected TNC conservation status